The 1988–89 Middle Tennessee Blue Raiders men's basketball team represented Middle Tennessee State University during the 1988–89 NCAA Division I men's basketball season. The Blue Raiders, led by fifth-year head coach Bruce Stewart, played their home games at the Murphy Center in Murfreesboro, Tennessee and were members of the Ohio Valley Conference. They finished the season 23–8, 10–2 in OVC play to win the regular season championship. In the OVC tournament, they defeated Eastern Kentucky and Austin Peay to receive the conference's automatic bid to the NCAA tournament. As the No. 13 seed in the Southeast region, they defeated Florida State in the first round before losing in the second round to Virginia.

Roster

Schedule and results

|-
!colspan=9 style=| Non-conference regular season

|-
!colspan=9 style=| Regular season

|-
!colspan=9 style=| OVC tournament

|-
!colspan=9 style=| NCAA tournament

Rankings

References

Middle Tennessee Blue Raiders men's basketball seasons
Middle Tennessee
Middle Tennessee
Middle Tennessee Blue Raiders
Middle Tennessee Blue Raiders